Leapin' Lizards may refer to:

 "Leapin' lizards!", a catchphrase from the comic strip Little Orphan Annie
 "Leapin' Lizards" (CSI), an episode of CSI: Crime Scene Investigation
 "Leapin' Lizards" (Frasier) an episode of Frasier